Nicola Vaccai (15 March 1790 – 5 or 6 August 1848) was an Italian composer, particularly of operas, and a singing teacher.

Life and career as a composer
Born at Tolentino, he grew up in Pesaro, and studied music there until his parents sent him to Rome to study law. Having no intention of becoming a lawyer, he took voice lessons and eventually studied counterpoint with Giuseppe Jannaconi, an important Roman composer. When Vaccai turned twenty one, he went to Naples and became a disciple of Paisiello, whose Barber of Seville was considered a comic masterpiece until Rossini's Barber swept it from the stage 35  years later.

Vaccai launched his career in Venice, initially earning his living by writing ballets and teaching voice.  He had his first operatic success with I solitari di Scozia in Naples in 1815.  In Parma he was commissioned to write Pietro il grande, where he was also one of the soloists in the first performance. This was followed by Zadig e Astartea (Naples, 1825) and then his best known opera Giulietta e Romeo (Milan, 1825).

Vaccai's sojourn in London began with a production of his most successful opera, Romeo and Juliet, at Kings Theatre in April, 1832. His charm and continental reputation ingratiated him to society and soon he was much sought after as a teacher.

Ending his wanderings with a return to Italy, Vaccai became a director and professor of composition at the Milan Conservatory in 1838. After six years he retired on account of poor health to his boyhood home, Pesaro, where he wrote his sixteenth opera. He died there in 1848.

Work as a teacher of singing: his Metodo pratico de canto 
Later eclipsed by his rival Bellini, Vaccai is now chiefly remembered as a voice teacher. One of his notable students was soprano Marianna Barbieri-Nini. Vaccai wrote many books, one of which is his 1832 Metodo pratico de canto (Practical Vocal Method), which has been transposed to accommodate different voice types such as alto or low ranges such as bass in order to instruct students in the method of singing in the Italian legato style.  It is still in print and is used as a teaching tool.

In his introduction, Vaccai notes that only the voice of a master demonstrating his exercises accurately can instruct a student in the correct techniques of true legato singing.  The book is also an important source of information about the performance of early 19th-century opera.

Voice teacher Elio Battaglia edited a new teacher’s edition of the "Metodo practico" or “Practical Method of Italian Singing” which was published by Ricordi in 1990 and which was accompanied by a CD of examples.

On September 15, 2020, Teatro Nuovo (New York) released “Bel Canto in Thirty Minutes,” a complete recording of the “Practical Method of Italian Singing,” led by Will Crutchfield and featuring 22 singers including Santiago Ballerini, Lawrence Brownlee, Teresa Castillo, Junhan Choi, Georgia Jarman, Alisa Jordheim, Hannah Ludwig, Christine Lyons, Megan Marino, Dorian McCall, Madison Marie McIntosh, Angela Meade, Tamara Mumford, Lisette Oropesa, Daniel Mobbs, Jennifer Rowley, Nicholas Simpson, Michael Spyres, Derrek Stark, Alina Tamborini, Hans Tashjian, and Meigui Zhang.

Operas

Legacy
Teatro Nicola Vaccaj, the opera house in Tolentino, is named after the musician.

References
Notes

Sources
Budden, Julian (1998), "Vaccai, Nicola" in Stanley Sadie, (Ed.), The New Grove Dictionary of Opera, Vol. Four, pp. 881–882. London: Macmillan Publishers, Inc. 1998    
Legger, Gianni (n.d.), Drammaturgia musicale italiana, Fondazzione Teatro Reggio (Torino).
Vaccai, Nicola (1996), Practical Method of Italian Singing: Mezzo Soprano (Alto) or Baritone, G. Schirmer, Inc.  Another edition of Vaccaj's vocal treatise exists in three separated fascicules in which curator M.-G. Genesi gives complete version of the verses used by the composer, and also adds the introductory Recitative section of each exercise, permitting to the singer to include this "enlarged version" of the single pieces within a vocal concert programme. Edition: Piacenza, 2003,in 3 volumes.      
Warrack, John and West, Ewan (1992), The Oxford Dictionary of Opera, 782 pages.

External links

Zadig e Astartea: drama serio em dois actos, 1837 publication, digitized by BYU

1790 births
1848 deaths
People from the Province of Macerata
Italian classical composers
Italian male classical composers
Italian Romantic composers
Italian opera composers
Male opera composers
Academic staff of Milan Conservatory
People from Pesaro
Voice teachers
19th-century classical composers
19th-century Italian male musicians